The South Carolina Republican Party (SCGOP) is the state affiliate of the national Republican Party in South Carolina. It is one of two major political parties in the state, along with the South Carolina Democratic Party, and is the dominant party. Incumbent governor Henry McMaster, as well as senators Tim Scott and Lindsey Graham, are Republicans. Graham has served since January 3, 2003, having been elected in 2002 and re-elected in 2008, 2014, and 2020; Tim Scott was appointed in 2013 by then-governor Nikki Haley, who is also a Republican.

Since 2003, every governor of South Carolina has been a Republican. Additionally, Republicans hold a supermajority in both the South Carolina Senate and South Carolina House of Representatives. In 2020, District 1, which was represented by Democrat Joe Cunningham, was won by Republican Nancy Mace; the party now represents six out of seven of the state's congressional districts.

The political system in South Carolina
South Carolina elections select officials for the executive, legislative, and judicial branches of the local, state, and federal levels of government.  The state legislature is composed of a Senate containing 46 elected officials and a House of Representatives with 124 members.  On the federal level, citizens of South Carolina elect two senators and seven representatives to the United States Congress.  The executive branch of South Carolina is headed by a governor elected to a four-year term.  The state has nine electoral college votes in presidential elections.

Leadership
The party is led by an elected group of state party officers, the South Carolina Republican Party State Executive Committee and paid staff. The state party organization is headquartered in Columbia, South Carolina.

The current state party officers are:

 Chairman: Drew McKissick
 National Committeewoman: Cindy Costa
 National Committeeman: Glenn McCall
 First Vice Chairman: Cindy Risher
 Second Vice Chairman: Leon Winn
 Third Vice Chairman: Tyler Griffin
 Treasurer and Comptroller: Sharon Thomson
 Recording Secretary: Cindy Risher
 Parliamentarian: Nate Leupp
 Executive Director: Hope Walker
 First Congressional District Chairman: Peggy Bangle
 Second Congressional District Chairman: Craig Caldwell
 Third Congressional District Chairman: Susan Aiken
 Fourth Congressional District Chairman: Beverly Owensby
 Fifth Congressional District Chairman: Freddie Gault
 Sixth Congressional District Chairman: Sandra Bryan
 Seventh Congressional District Chairman: Jerry Rovner
 South Carolina Teenage Republicans Chairman: Patton Byars
 South Carolina College Republicans Chairman:  Emma Scott
 South Carolina Federation of Republican Women President: Beverly Owensby
 South Carolina Young Republicans Chairman: Sarah Jane Walker

Former State Chairmen are:
 Robert B. Elliott (1874–80)
 Edmund William McGregor Mackey (1880–84)
 Thomas E. Miller (1884)
 Rev. R. W. Memminger (1892)
 Joseph W. Tolbert (1925–31)
 D.A. Gardner (1932–36)
 J. Bates Gerald (1938–50)
 David Dows (1956–58)
 Gregory D. Shorey, Jr. (1958–60)
 Robert F. Chapman (1960–61)
 J. Drake Edens Jr. (1963–65)
 Harry S. Dent (1965–68)
 Raymond A. Harris (1968–71)
 C. Kenneth Powell (1971–74)
 Jesse L. Cooksey (1974–76)
 Daniel I. Ross Jr. (1976–80)
 Dr. George G. Graham (1980–86)
 Van Hipp Jr. (1987–89)
 Barry Wynn (1990–93)
 Henry D. McMaster (1993-2002)
 Katon Dawson (2002–09)
 Karen Floyd (2009–11)
 Chad Connelly (2011–13)
 Matt Moore (2013–17)
 Drew McKissick (2017–present)

History
The Republican Party of the United States was founded during the 1850s in response to the political tensions that revolved around slavery and came to define that era.  The Republican Party's goal was to abolish slavery and preserve the hierarchy of the national government over that of the states. The ensuing years were marked by an increasing divide between northern and southern states that eventually boiled over when the state of South Carolina seceded from the Union in 1860.  Other southern states followed and the Civil War of the United States began in 1861 between the Union and the newly minted Confederacy.  In 1865, the conflict ended with the Union as the victor.  Following this, the southern and formerly Confederate states were gradually reintroduced back into the Union of the United States with a process that came to be called the Reconstruction Era of the United States.  Northern Republicans and freed slaves came to control the politics of South Carolina during this era, as Confederates were temporarily disenfranchised. The planter elite struggled to adapt to a free labor system. The Republican Party of South Carolina was established during this time and controlled the politics of South Carolina throughout Reconstruction. Democrats mounted increasing violence and fraud at elections from 1868 through the period, in an effort to suppress the black and Republican vote. In 1874, the paramilitary Red Shirts arose as a paramilitary group working openly to disrupt Republican meetings, suppress black voting and return Democrats to power. The most violence occurred in counties where blacks were a strong minority, as Democrats tried to reduce their challenge.

White Democrats led by Wade Hampton won the governorship and control of the state legislature in 1876. They dominated the state government for decades, controlling most candidates for governor and for national office. Freedmen were still able to elect Republicans to local office in some counties, giving them a say in daily government.

Following a brief coalition between the Republican Party and Populists in the late 19th century, the South  Carolina legislature followed others in the South in passing a constitution to disenfranchise most blacks and many poor whites. The Constitution of 1895 was a departure from the Reconstruction Constitution of 1868 that aimed to keep the majority black population from voting. However, the poll tax, property requirements and literacy requirements also keep poor whites from voting.  By excluding blacks from politics, the Democrats secured their power and ended the Republican challenge. The legislatures passed such laws and constitutions from 1890 to 1908, turning most of the South into a one-party region dominated by Democrats. The Solid South disenfranchised large portions of its states' populations. The exclusion of freedmen and their descendants from the political system resulted in the South Carolina Republican Party with very little influence within the state for generations after. This control would last until the second half of the twentieth century.

In the 1960s, the Civil Rights Movement intensified in the South, and in early July 1964, the Civil Rights Act was passed.  The Act, passed with the support of Democratic President Lyndon B. Johnson, ended legal segregation in public accommodations.

On September 16, 1964, Senator Strom Thurmond announced to a statewide television audience that he had switched parties from the Democrats to the Republicans, saying the Democratic "party of our fathers is dead." He said it had "forsaken the people to become the party of minority groups, power-hungry union leaders, political bosses, and businessmen looking for government contracts and favors". The Voting Rights Act of 1965 was passed the following year, restoring the ability of minorities to vote through federal oversight of registration and electoral processes.

In 1967, Carolyn Frederick was elected to represent House District 22 in Greenville County. Frederick the first Republican woman elected to the House.

In 1974, James B. Edwards became the first Republican to be elected the Governor of South Carolina since Reconstruction. Since the late 20th century, South Carolina's voters have increasingly supported Republican candidates for local, state and national offices.

In 2010, Republican Mick Mulvaney was elected as the representative of South Carolina's 5th congressional district, the first Republican to represent that district since Robert Smalls, the party's co-founder, last held the seat in 1883. The election of Mulvaney was the first break in 100+ years of Democratic control in the State Legislature.
Also in 2010, Republican Nikki Haley was elected the first female Governor of South Carolina and the second Indian-American, after fellow Republican Bobby Jindal, to serve as a governor in the United States.

South Carolina's January 21, 2012 Republican Presidential Preference Primary was the party's then-largest ever, drawing more than 600,000 voters. Newt Gingrich won the race with 40.4% of the vote. The highly contested election set multiple state records for a presidential primary cycle; candidates held five presidential debates and spent $13.2 million in television ads. Governor Haley, mentioned above, appointed Republic Tim Scott to the U.S. Senate. Scott is the first African-American senator from South Carolina and the first from the South since 1881.

The state's February 20, 2016 Republican Presidential Preference Primary saw a new turnout record of over 740,000 voters. Donald Trump won the primary with 32.5% of the vote.

As President Donald Trump faced no significant primary opposition, the SCGOP cancelled the 2020 Republican Presidential Preference Primary.

Current elected officials
The South Carolina Republican Party controls all nine of the nine statewide offices and holds large majorities in the South Carolina Senate and the South Carolina House of Representatives. Republicans also hold both of the state's U.S. Senate seats and six of the state's seven U.S. House of Representatives seats.

In 2012, Republican Tom Rice became the representative of South Carolina's 7th congressional district, newly re-established because of population gains. He is the first person to represent that district since it was eliminated in 1933.

In a 2013 special election, former Republican Governor Mark Sanford was elected as the representative of South Carolina's 1st congressional district, returning to the seat he previously held from 1995 to 2001.

Members of Congress

U.S. Senate

U.S. House of Representatives

Statewide offices
Governor: Henry McMaster
Lieutenant Governor: Pamela Evette
Secretary of State: Mark Hammond
Attorney General: Alan Wilson
Comptroller General: Richard Eckstrom
Treasurer: Curtis Loftis
Superintendent of Education: Ellen Weaver
Adjutant General: Robert E. Livingston Jr.
Commissioner of Agriculture: Hugh Weathers

State legislature
President Pro Tem of the Senate: Hugh K. Leatherman Sr.
Senate Majority Leader: A. Shane Massey
Speaker of the House: Murrell Smith Jr.
Speaker Pro Tempore: Tommy Pope
House Majority Leader: Davey Hiott

Important past elected officials
Strom Thurmond (December 5, 1902 – June 26, 2003) was a United States Senator from South Carolina from 1954 to 2003. Thurmond served as a city and county attorney before he was elected to the South Carolina state senate in 1932. Following completion of military duty during World War II, Thurmond served as the governor of South Carolina from 1947 to 1951. He was a member of the Democratic Party for a decade; it dominated all southern states until after passage of civil rights legislation in the mid-1960s. With other Dixiecrats, he resisted changes for social justice after the US Supreme Court ruled in 1954 that segregation of public schools was unconstitutional. In 1964 he switched to the Republican Party. He has held the records for longest senate career, oldest voting member of the Senate in history, the only Senator to reach 100 years of age while in office, the record for longest filibuster in senate history at 24 hours and 18 minutes, and the longest-serving Dean of the United States Senate, after maintaining the position for 14 years.
Robert Smalls (April 5, 1839- February 23, 1915), one of the founders of the South Carolina Republican Party, was an African-American slave in South Carolina who escaped to become a free man, war hero, and a politician.  Born into slavery, Smalls was taken by his masters to Charleston, South Carolina in 1851; there he worked at several different labor jobs.  At the onset of the Civil War in 1861, Smalls was hired to work aboard a steamship named Planter, which served as an armed transport for the Confederate Army carrying guns and ammunition.  On May 13, 1862, he and other black crew aboard the Planter seized control of the ship and successfully turned it and its cargo over to the Union Army.  Smalls gained heroic status and was appointed as the first African-American captain of a U. S. military vessel. After the war, Smalls entered politics and joined the Republican Party. He was elected to the South Carolina House of Representatives from 1868 to 1870 and the South Carolina State Senate from 1870 to 1874. Next, he was elected to three terms in the US House of Representatives from South Carolina's 5th congressional district. He was the last Republican to be elected from that district until 2010, as Democrats suppressed black voting and disenfranchised blacks at the turn of the century, fatally weakening the Republican Party.

See also
Republican National Committee
South Carolina Democratic Party
List of governors of South Carolina
United States congressional delegations from South Carolina
List of United States senators from South Carolina
List of United States representatives from South Carolina

References

External links
South Carolina Republican Party
South Carolina College Republicans
Republican Party of South Carolina Records at the University of South Carolina's South Carolina Political Collections

South Carolina
Republican party
1867 establishments in South Carolina
Political parties established in 1867